The Karbala governorate election of 2009 was held on 31 January 2009 alongside elections for all other governorates outside Iraqi Kurdistan and Kirkuk.

Results 

|- style="background-color:#E9E9E9"
! style="text-align:left;vertical-align:top;" |Coalition 2005/2009!! Allied national parties !! Leader !!Seats (2005) !! Seats (2009) !! Change !!Votes
|-
| style="text-align:left;" |Yousef Majid Al-Habboubi || style="text-align:left;" |Independent || || – || 1 || +1 ||37,864
|-
| style="text-align:left;" |Amal al-Rafidayn (Hope of Rafidain) || || Abbas al-MusawiMohammad al-Musawi || – || 9 || +9 || 26,967
|-
| style="text-align:left;" |State of Law Coalition || style="text-align:left;" | Islamic Dawa Party || style="text-align:left;" |Nouri Al-Maliki|| – || 9 || +9|| 25,469
|-
| style="text-align:left;" |Al Mihrab Martyr List || style="text-align:left;" |ISCI|| style="text-align:left;" |Abdul Aziz al-Hakim|| 21 || 4 || -15 || 19,364
|-
| style="text-align:left;" |Independent Free Movement List || style="text-align:left;" |Sadrist Movement || style="text-align:left;" |Muqtada al-Sadr || – || 4 || +4 || 19,215
|-
| style="text-align:left;" |Islamic Virtue Party || style="text-align:left;" |Islamic Vertue Party ||Abdelrahim Al-Husseini || 5 || – || -5 ||7,826
|-
| style="text-align:left;" |Independent Council of Tribal Shaykhs & Notables of Karbala Governorate   ||  || style="text-align:left;" | || 2 || – || -2 ||6,175
|-
| style="text-align:left;" |Democratic Meeting for Holy Karbala  ||  || style="text-align:left;" | || 2 || – || -2 ||
|-
| style="text-align:left;" |Democratic Progressive Gathering  ||  || style="text-align:left;" | ||2  || – || -2 ||
|-
| style="text-align:left;" |Independent Intellectuals Gathering   ||  || style="text-align:left;" | || 2 || – || -2 ||
|-
| style="text-align:left;" |Independent Unified List for the Governorate of Holy Karbala   ||  || style="text-align:left;" | || 2 || – || -2 ||
|-
| style="text-align:left;" |Iraqi Democratic Current    ||  || style="text-align:left;" | || 2 || – || -2 ||
|-
| style="text-align:left;" |Shi’ite Political Council    ||  || style="text-align:left;" | || 2 || – || -2  ||
|-
| style="text-align:left;" |Abbas al-Hasnawi    ||  || style="text-align:left;" | ||1  || – || -1 ||
|-
| style="text-align:left;" |Other Parties  || || ||  ||  || || 
|-
| style="text-align:left;" colspan=2 | Total || || 41 || 27 || -14||291,479
|-
|colspan=5|Sources: this article – al Sumaria – New York Times -
|}

References 

2009 Iraqi governorate elections
Karbala Governorate